"Til a Woman Comes Along" is the debut single of American country music singer Chris Janson. Janson co-wrote the song with Cole Deggs and Philip Eugene O'Donnell.

Critical reception
Matt Bjorke of Roughstock gave the song a positive review, saying that "The story here is real and authentic and Chris Janson's vocal (a deep baritone with some grit) adds the right amount of swagger to the tune.  The instrumental solos are strong and Chris Janson's harmonica solo is a highlight as well."

Music video
The music video was directed by Chris Hicky and premiered in May 2010.

Chart performance
The song debuted at No. 56 on the Billboard Hot Country Songs charts dated for the week ending May 1, 2010.

References

2010 debut singles
Chris Janson songs
2010 songs
BNA Records singles
Songs written by Phil O'Donnell (songwriter)
Music videos directed by Chris Hicky
Songs written by Chris Janson